Miss Europe 1993 was the 48th edition of the Miss Europe pageant and the 37th edition under the Mondial Events Organization. It was held in Istanbul, Turkey on July 12, 1993. Arzum Onan of Turkey, was crowned Miss Europe 1993 by out going titleholder Marina Tsintikidou of Greece.

Results

Placements

Special awards

Contestants 

 - Sidorela Kola
 - Nelly Schperin
 - Gergana Fidanova
 - Jana Rybská
 - Mette Marie Salto
 - Alison Hobson
 - Teini Vaher
 - Emilia Söderman
 -  Véronique de la Cruz
 - Verona Feldbusch
 - Afrodite Kouli
 - Esther de Jong
 - Svala Björk Arnardóttir
 - UNKNOWN
 - Dana Avrish
 - Marika Coco
 - Vilmantė Nainytė
 - Nathalie Dos Santos
 - Romina Genuis
 - Julianne Skovli
 - Dorota Wróbel
 - Carla Marisa da Cruz
 - Adriana Silaci
 - Yuliya Alekseyeva
 - Laura King
 - Silvia Lakatošová
 - Ana Maria Pérez Ayllón
 - Christina Gustavsson (Christina Gustafsson)
 - Beatrice Kohl
 - Arzum Onan
 - Veronika Ordynskaya

Notes

Withdrawals
 - Stéphanie Meire

 - Split into the Czech Republic and the Slovak Republic in 1993, thus withdrew and stop competing in the pageant.
 - Bernadett Papp
 - Natalie Lee

Debuts/Returns
 - Was represented in the pageant as Czechoslovakia in prior editions. This is the first time the Czech Republic is competing as its own country.
 - Was represented in the pageant as Czechoslovakia in prior editions. This is the first time the Slovak Republic is competing as its own country.
 - Was represented in the pageant as Russia/USSR back in 1929 and the 1930s.

Returns

References

External links 
 

Miss Europe
1993 beauty pageants
1993 in Turkey